Phelps "Catfish" Collins (October 17, 1943 – August 6, 2010) was an American musician. A lead guitarist and rhythm guitarist, he is known mostly for his work in the P-Funk collective. Although frequently overshadowed by his younger brother, Bootsy Collins, Catfish played on many important and influential records by James Brown, Parliament, Funkadelic, and Bootsy's Rubber Band.

Early life
Phelps Collins was raised in Cincinnati, Ohio. He was the older brother of William "Bootsy" Collins, whom he encouraged musically from a young age. It was Bootsy who nicknamed Phelps as "Catfish" because Bootsy thought he looked like a fish.

Career
In 1968, the Collins brothers, along with Kash Waddy and Philippé Wynne, formed a group called The Pacemakers. Later the Pacemakers were hired by James Brown to accompany his vocals, at this they became known as The J.B.'s. Some of Brown's previous band members had walked out because of money disputes.

During their tenure in the J.B.'s, they recorded such classics as "Super Bad", "Get Up (I Feel Like Being A) Sex Machine", "Soul Power" and "Give It Up or Turnit a Loose".  By 1971, Collins and the rest of the J.B.'s had quit James Brown.

The Collins brothers and Kash Waddy formed House Guests and shortly after joined Funkadelic and contributed to the Funkadelic album America Eats Its Young. On Catfish's early work with James Brown and Funkadelic, Catfish played a Vox Ultrasonic guitar with built-in effects. Some of his most famous playing can be heard on the Parliament hit single "Flash Light". Four years later, Collins joined Bootsy's Rubber Band, which included Waddy, Joel "Razor Sharp" Johnson (keyboards), Gary "Muddbone" Cooper (vocals) and Robert "P-Nut" Johnson (vocals), along with The Horny Horns.

Collins played on albums by Freekbass and H-Bomb. In 1990, he performed on Deee-Lite's biggest hit "Groove Is in the Heart". In 2007, he contributed guitar work to the Superbad movie soundtrack.

Personal life
He died on August 6, 2010, in Cincinnati after a long battle with cancer. He was survived by two children.

Catfish Nation Celebration, a memorial concert, was held outside Cincinnati in Covington, Kentucky, at the Madison Theater and was attended by a number of musicians as well as hundreds of concertgoers.

References 

1943 births
2010 deaths
Musicians from Cincinnati
African-American guitarists
American funk guitarists
American rhythm and blues guitarists
American soul guitarists
American male guitarists
Deaths from cancer in Ohio
Guitarists from Ohio
P-Funk members
The J.B.'s members
Rhythm guitarists
Burials at Vine Street Hill Cemetery
20th-century American guitarists